Ban Than may refer to:

Ban Than Subdistrict, Phetchaburi province, Thailand
the Vietnamese name of the Zhongzhou Reef